Tupitsa is a rural locality (a village) in Khokhlovskoye Rural Settlement, Permsky District, Perm Krai, Russia. The population was 29 as of 2010. There are 20 streets.

Geography 
Tupitsa is located 31 km north of Perm (the district's administrative centre) by road. Zaozerye is the nearest rural locality.

References 

Rural localities in Permsky District